Santanna Blue Chip (foaled 27 April 2005) is a champion Standardbred racehorse.  He was sired by Art Major, out of Mmissus Hanover, a Matts Scooter mare.  The colt was purchased at the Harrisburg Yearling Sales for $75 000.  He is currently owned by Carl Jamieson, Jeffrey Gillis, George Arthur Stable, and 1140545 Ontario Ltd.  As of 24 November 2007, Santanna Blue Chip had earned $927,095 in his career.

The most notable of Santanna's achievements include wins of the 2007 Governor's Cup, and the 2007 Breeder's Crown.

Canadian Standardbred racehorses